Chroicocephalus is a genus of medium to relatively small gulls which were included in the genus Larus until recently. Some authorities also include the Saunders's gull in Chroicocephalus. The genus name  Chroicocephalus is from Ancient Greek khroizo, "to colour", and kephale, "head".

Representatives of this genus are found in regions/subregions all over the world, each species usually being confined to a region.

Species

Fossils
Huahine gull †Chroicocephalus utunui -French Polynesia.

References

 
Bird genera
Taxa named by Thomas Campbell Eyton